Autocharis sarobialis is a nocturnal moth in the family Crambidae, also known as Crambid snout moths. It is found in Afghanistan.

References

Moths described in 1970
Odontiinae
Moths of Asia